Thierry Zig (born July 4, 1975 in Bondy, Seine-Saint-Denis) is a French former professional basketball player.

Career
1994-1995:  Levallois: 6g 0.7ppg 0.3rpg
1995-1996:  Levallois: 26g 3.2ppg 0.4rpg 1.0apg
1996-1997:  Levallois: 29g 10.2ppg 1.8rpg 2.0apg
1997-1998:  Paris Basket Racing: 5.2ppg, 1.6rpg, 1.6apg
1998-1999:  Paris Basket Racing: 7.5ppg, 1apg
1999-2000:  Paris Basket Racing: 4.9ppg
2000: Nike Summer League in Treviso (ITA): All-Star Team
2000-2001:  Paris Basket Racing (1T): 7.1ppg, 2rpg, 1.5apg; Saporta Cup: 13.6ppg, 2.2rpg, 1.1apg
2001-2002:  Strasbourg IG, in Dec.'01 signed at Gijón Baloncesto (ESP-ACB): ACB Regular Season stats: 20 games: 6.4ppg, 1.2rpg, 13ast
2002-2003:  Unicaja Málaga (ESP-ACB): Euroleague: 2 games: 4.0ppg, 2reb; Spanish ACB League: 2 games: 1.5ppg, 0reb, 3.0apg, 1.0spg, then at CB Granada (ESP-ACB): 9 games: 5.1ppg, 1.0rpg, 7ast, shortly at Paris BR (ProA): 6 games: 7.8ppg, 4reb, 3ast, in April '03 signed at CB Tarragona (ESP-LEB1): 2 games: 14.0ppg, 1.0apg
2003-2004:  Paris Basket Racing (ProA): FIBA Europe Cup: 2 games: 9.5ppg, 2.0rpg, 1ast; French ProA League: 5 games: 9.2ppg, 2.6rpg, 1.2apg, in Dec.'03 was tested at Sicilia Messina (ITA-SerieA), in Feb.'04 signed at J.D.A. Dijon (ProA); French ProA League: 14 games: 6.1ppg, 1.4rpg, 1.6apg
2004 July:  Southern California Summer Pro League in Long Beach, CA (San Antonio Spurs)
2004-2005:  Basket Livorno (SerieA): 34 games: 5.3ppg, 1.7rpg, 2FGP: 51.2%, 3FGP: 32.5%
2005-2006:  Viola Reggio Calabria (SerieA): 26 games: 6.2ppg, 2.2rpg, 1.0apg, 1.0spg, 2FGP: 36.7%, 3PT: 32.7%, FT: 58.8%
2006-2007:  In Dec.'06 signed at Mlekarna Kunin Novi Jicin (CZE-NBL), left next month
2008-2009:  Boulazac (ProB): 19 games: 12ppg, 2 apg, 2FGP: 34%, 3PT: 43%, FT: 68%

External links
Statistics at Basketstat 

1975 births
Living people
Sportspeople from Bondy
French expatriate basketball people in Spain
French men's basketball players
Liga ACB players
CB Granada players
Baloncesto Málaga players
Gijón Baloncesto players
CB Tarragona players
Forwards (basketball)
Guards (basketball)
Levallois Sporting Club Basket players